Gary Kroner is a former player in the American Football League for the Denver Broncos from 1965 to 1967. He played at the collegiate level at the University of Wisconsin–Madison.

Biography
Kroner was born Gary Lee Kroner on November 6, 1940 in Green Bay, Wisconsin.

References

1940 births
Denver Broncos (AFL) players
Sportspeople from Green Bay, Wisconsin
Players of American football from Wisconsin
Living people
Wisconsin Badgers football players